is a passenger railway station located in Saiwai-ku, Kawasaki, Kanagawa Prefecture, Japan, operated by the East Japan Railway Company (JR East).

Lines
Shitte Station is served by the Nambu Line.

Station layout
The station consists of a single side platform and an island platform serving three elevated tracks, connected by an underpass. The station has a "Midori no Madoguchi" staffed ticket office.

Platforms

History
The station opened on the Nambu Railway on 9 March 1927, initially named . It officially became a full station in 1929. The Nambu Branch Line opened on 25 March 1930, initially as a freight-only line. The Nambu Railway was nationalized on 1 April 1944, becoming part of the Japanese Government Railway (JGR) system, which became the Japanese National Railways (JNR) from 1949. A freight-only spur line to the Shin-Tsurumi Freight Terminal was opened on 1 October 1973 from the line just north of the station. With the privatization of JNR on 1 April 1987, the station came under the control of JR East.

Passenger statistics
In fiscal 2019, the station was used by an average of 15,067 passengers daily (boarding passengers only).

The passenger figures (boarding passengers only) for previous years are as shown below.

Surrounding area
 Kawasaki City Central Wholesale Market 
Shioda General Hospital
Hie Shrine
Shitte Ginza Shopping Street
 Yokohama City Yako Elementary School

See also
List of railway stations in Japan

References

External links

 JR East Station information 

Railway stations in Kawasaki, Kanagawa
Stations of East Japan Railway Company
Nambu Line
Railway stations in Japan opened in 1927